Ilford Airport  is located  south southwest of Ilford, Manitoba, Canada.

References

External links

Certified airports in Manitoba

Transport in Northern Manitoba